SF X Fantasy Rayforce (lit. Time-Space Chronicle Rayforce) is a proposed South Korean television series produced by MMORPG developer T3 Entertainment. The show was planned to last for two 26-episode seasons. Rayforce was made as a response to the popularity of Japanese tokusatsu superhero programs in South Korea, and was to be accompanied by video games and toys. It was planned to broadcast in South Korea in the second half of 2010. Broadcasting rights were sold to broadcasters in Thailand and negotiations were in progress for broadcasters in Taiwan, Hong Kong, and the Philippines. As of January 2012, the series has been shelved due to a lack of investors.

References

South Korean children's television shows
2010 South Korean television series debuts
Korean-language television shows
Tokusatsu television series